Thomas McCleister (born May 26, 1949, New York City) is an American actor who is perhaps best known for his role as Ike on Married... with Children. McCleister also played the part of Kolos on the series Star Trek: Deep Space Nine, appearing in the episode "Q-Less". He has made guest appearances on such shows as NYPD Blue, Roswell, Angel, Matlock, Jake and the Fatman, Diagnosis Murder, and Providence. His motion picture credits include Midnight Run (1988), a supporting role in the box-office smash Arnold Schwarzenegger-Danny DeVito film Twins (1988), Crazy in Alabama (1999), and Grand Theft Parsons (2003). In 2004 he portrayed a lawyer in Clint Eastwood's Academy Award winning drama Million Dollar Baby.

Selected filmography

 Splitz (1982) .... Warwick
 The American Snitch (1983) .... Shapiro
 Hard Choices (1985) .... Blinky
 Matlock (TV Series) .... Metro Cop
      Episode: "The Don: Part 1" (1986)
      Episode: "The Don: Part 2" (1986)
 Hill Street Blues (TV Series)
      Episode: "Der Roachenkavalier" (1987) .... First Bum
 Hunter (TV Series)
      Episode: "Hot Pursuit: Part 1" (1987) .... Jim Gleary
 Newhart (TV Series)
      Episode: "Take Me to Your Loudon" (1987) .... Party Attendee
 Mama's Family (TV Series)
      Episode: "Bed and Breakdown" (1988) .... Ernie Carruthers (as Thom McCleister)
 Inherit the Wind (1988) .... Bailiff
 Midnight Run (1988) .... Bill 'Red' Wood (as Thom McCleister)
 Twins (1988) .... Bob Klane (as Thom McCleister)
 Hooperman (TV Series)
      Episode: "Intolerance" (1988) .... Bob (as Thom McCleister)
 Fletch Lives (1989) .... Klansman No. 2
 Murphy Brown (TV Series)
      Episode: "Nowhere to Run" (1988) .... Stagehand
      Episode: "The Strike" (1989) .... Dwayne (as Thom McLeister)
 Wings (TV Series)
      Episode: "Marriage, Italian Style" (1992) .... Fisherman (as Thom McCleister)
      Episode: "Divorce, American Style" (1992) .... Fisherman (as Thom McCleister)
      Episode: "Two Jerks and a Jill" (1992) .... Tom
 The Wonder Years (TV Series)
      Episode: "Ladies and Gentlemen... the Rolling Stones" (1993) .... Wally
 Star Trek: Deep Space Nine (TV Series)
      Episode: "Q-Less" (1993) .... Kolos
 Cop and a Half (1993) .... Rudy
 Blossom (TV Series)
      Episode: "Blossom's Dilemma" .... Prison Guard
 NYPD Blue (TV Series)
      Episode: "Personal Foul" .... Corrections Officer
 The Adventures of Brisco County, Jr. (TV Series)
      Episode: "Ned Zed" .... Morgan
 Midnight Runaround (1994, TV Movie) .... Hal Mooney
 Married... with Children (TV Series) .... Ike
      Episode: "A Man for No Seasons" (1994)
      Episode: "I Want My Psycho Dad: Part 1" (1994)
      Episode: "I Want My Psycho Dad: Second Blood: Part 2" (1994)
      Episode: "The Naked and the Dead, But Mostly the Naked" (1995)
      Episode: "And Bingo Was Her Game-O" (1995)
      Episode: "Pump Fiction" (1995)
      Episode: "A Shoe Room with a View" (1995)
      Episode: "Reverend Al" (1995)
      Episode: "How Bleen Was My Kelly" (1995)
      Episode: "Flight of the Bumblebee" (1995)
      Episode: "I Can't Believe It's Butter" (1995)
      Episode: "The Hood, the Bud & the Kelly: Part 2" (1996)
      Episode: "The Agony and the Extra C" (1996)
      Episode: "Bud Hits the Books" (1996)
      Episode: "The Joke's on Al" (1996)
      Episode: "Requiem for a Chevyweight: Part 2" (1996)
      Episode: "The Stepford Peg"
      Episode: "Live Nude Peg"
 Dream a Little Dream 2 (1995) .... Little Tim
 Nowhere Man (TV Series)
      Episode: "Shine a Light on You" (1996) .... Hank Bower
 The Pest (1997) .... Leo
 The Jeff Foxworthy Show (TV Series)
      Episode: "Field of Schemes" (1997) .... Hoss Phister
 Millennium (TV Series)
      Episode: "Through a Glass, Darkly" (1998) .... Max Brunell
 Home Improvement (TV Series)
      Episode: "The Long and Winding Road: Part 1" (1999) .... Butch
 Buddy Boy (1999) .... Mr. Jones
 Crazy in Alabama (1999) .... Croupier
 Felicity (TV Series)
      Episode: "The Depths" (1999) .... Loren
 Everything Put Together (2000) .... Dr. Miller
 Roswell (TV Series)
      Episode: "Into the Woods" (2000) .... Rocky Calhoun
 The Huntress (TV Series)
      Episode: "Kidnapped" (2000) .... George
 Grosse Pointe (TV Series)
      Episode: "Prelude to a Kiss" (2000) .... Paul / Crew Guy
 Lost Souls (2000) .... Father Malcolm
 Titus (TV Series)
      Episode: "Locking Up Mom" (2000) .... James
 CSI: Crime Scene Investigation (TV Series)
      Episode: "Anonymous" (2000) .... Walter Bangler
 Diagnosis: Murder (TV Series)
      Episode: "Playing God" (2001) .... Casey Maguire
 JAG (TV Series)
      Episode: "Retreat, Hell" (2001) .... Jim Teasdale
 Angel (TV Series) .... Host's Elder
      Episode: "Through the Looking Glass" (2001)
      Episode: "There's No Place Like Plrtz Glrb" (2001)
 FreakyLinks (TV Series)
      Episode: "Subject: The Final Word" (2001) .... Homeless Man
 Providence (TV Series)
      Episode: "Gobble, Gobble" (2001)
 E! True Hollywood Story (TV Series)
      Episode: Married... with Children (2001) .... Himself
 It's All About You (2002) .... Mr. French
 A Lighter Shade of Pearl (2002) .... Lincoln Quahog
 Charmed (TV Series)
      Episode: "A Witch's Tail, Part 2" (2002) .... Fisherman
 Crossing Jordan (TV Series) .... Charlie the Guard
      Episode: "Pilot" (2001)
      Episode: "Miracles & Wonders" (2002)
      Episode: "Four Fathers" (2002)
 Cradle 2 the Grave (2003) .... Fight Club Fan
 Grand Theft Parsons (2003) .... Polyonax Place Barman
 Navy NCIS: Naval Criminal Investigative Service (TV Series)
      Episode: "My Other Lef"t Foot" (2004) .... Captain Brent Peters
 Envy (2004) .... Bosco
 Girlfriends (TV Series)
      Episode: "When Hearts Attack" (2004) .... Bob
 Million Dollar Baby (2004) .... Lawyer
 ER (TV Series)
      Episode: "Only Connect" (2005) .... Larry
 Bones (TV Series)
      Episode: "The Man in the Morgue" (2006) .... Peter LaSalle (as Thom McLeister)

References

External links
 

American male television actors
American male stage actors
American male film actors
1949 births
Living people
Male actors from New York City
20th-century American male actors
21st-century American male actors